Bernard Anthony Rudden,  (21 August 1933 – 4 March 2015) was a British legal scholar. He was the Professor of Comparative Law at the University of Oxford from 1979 to 1999.

Early life and education
Rudden was born on 21 August 1933 in Carlisle, Cumbria, England. He was educated at a local primary school in Carlisle, and then at City of Norwich School, then an all-boys grammar school in Norwich. He learned Russian at school, and this led to his National Service being spent, according to his The Times obituary, with the "intelligence services deciphering Russian communications". He was called up to the British Army in 1951, and attended the Joint Services Russian Course, first in Cambridge and then in Bodmin when the school moved to Cornwall. Having completed his training and gaining an above degree level of Russian, he was posted to the Intelligence Corps depot at Maresfield, East Sussex, where he specialised in the Soviet Union.

In 1953, having completed his National Service, Rudden matriculated into St John's College, Cambridge. He originally studied English literature with the aim of becoming a poet, but after two years he switched to law. Having graduated with a Bachelor of Arts (BA) degree, he began training as a solicitor. Having qualified, he worked as a solicitor in Norwich for a time, before returning to academia.

Academic career
Having left behind legal practice, Rudden was appointed an assistant lecturer in law at the University College of Wales, Aberystwyth. During this time, he also studied for a Doctor of Philosophy (PhD) degree in Soviet tort law, which was awarded to him by the University of Wales. In 1965, he moved to the University of Oxford, where he was elected fellow and tutor in law at Oriel College, Oxford. In 1979, he was selected to become the next Professor of Comparative Law at the University of Oxford in succession to Barry Nicholas. This chair meant that he had to move college, and he became a fellow of Brasenose College, Oxford. He retired from Oxford in 1999.

References 

1933 births
2015 deaths
Fellows of Brasenose College, Oxford
Academics of the University of Oxford
Fellows of the British Academy
Fellows of Oriel College, Oxford
English solicitors
British legal scholars
Linklaters Professors of Comparative Law
People educated at the City of Norwich School
Alumni of St John's College, Cambridge
Academics of Aberystwyth University
Alumni of the University of Wales
Scholars of comparative law